Charles Augustus Wikoff (March 3, 1837 – July 1, 1898) was a Union Army officer serving from American Civil War until he became the most senior ranking American Army officer killed in the Spanish–American War.

Early life and education
Wikoff was born in Easton, Pennsylvania, and graduated from Lafayette College with bachelor's and master's degrees.  He worked as a civil engineer under George B. McClellan on the Illinois Central Railroad from 1855 to 1857.

Military career

American Civil War
In April 1861, at the outbreak of the American Civil War, Wikoff enlisted as a private in the 1st Pennsylvania Infantry Division. The following month, he was commissioned first lieutenant in the 15th U.S. Infantry. He was shot in the left eye at the Battle of Shiloh and wore an eye patch throughout the rest of his life. He also participated in the Battle of Chickamauga and the Battle of Missionary Ridge, for which he was a brevetted major. He was promoted to captain in August 1864.

Postbellum
After the war, Wikoff was transferred to the 24th U.S. Infantry, and later to the 11th Infantry, serving in Texas and The Dakotas. He was promoted to major of the 14th Infantry stationed at Vancouver Barracks in December 1886. In November 1891, he was made lieutenant colonel of the 19th Infantry, and served at Forts Wayne and Brady in Michigan. In January 1897, he became colonel of the 22nd Infantry at Fort Crook, Nebraska.

Death in Battle of San Juan Hill
In 1898, in the Spanish–American War, Wikoff led the 22nd Infantry from Fort Crook to Cuba, where he was transferred to lead the 3rd Brigade, 2nd Division under the command of Major General William Rufus Shafter's V Corps. 

On July 1, 1898, he was shot during a charge across an open field in the Battle of San Juan Hill in Santiago de Cuba. Within 15 minutes, he succumbed to his wound. His two successors, William S. Worth and Emerson H. Liscum, were also shot before Ezra P. Ewers, the fourth in command, assumed control.

Legacy
Wikoff was buried in Easton Cemetery in Easton, Pennsylvania. 

Camp Wikoff in Montauk, New York, through which American troops including Theodore Roosevelt returned after the conflict, was named in Wikoff's honor.

References

External links
Charles Augustus Wikoff at Easton Cemetery
Charles A. Wikoff at Historical Marker Database

1837 births
1898 deaths
American military personnel killed in the Spanish–American War
American military personnel of the Spanish–American War
Lafayette College alumni
People from Easton, Pennsylvania
People of Pennsylvania in the American Civil War
Union Army officers
United States Army colonels